Greenville High School, official name Bond County Community Unit #2 High School, is a high school for grades 9-12 students located in Greenville, Illinois.  It serves students from much of Bond County, Illinois, including Pocahontas and Sorento.

The school is commonly referred to as GHS and is home to the Greenville Comets sports teams.

History 
Greenville has had a high school for 138 years, with the first "Greenville High School" created in 1869.  The school was begun under the auspices of Samuel Inglis, who would later become the state superintendent of schools.  The first building was torn down and a new Central School erected on Second Street in 1894.  By 1915, a new school building was located at Beaumont and Wyatt streets.  The current building was constructed in 1956; the former Beaumont building was used as Greenville Junior High after the new high school was built.  As the new high school opened, high schools in Pocahontas and Sorento closed and those students began attending GHS.

Noted environmental activist Howard Zahniser, who wrote the Wilderness Act of 1964, taught English at Greenville High School in the 1930s.  1956 Prohibition Party candidate for President, Enoch A. Holtwick, was a professor of history and government at Greenville College and talked to Greenville High School classes in the 1950s.

The yearbook is named The Graduate and has been published since 1918.  The school newspaper was originally called The G Whiz, later The GHS Times and then called The Comet Spirit.

Country music star Gretchen Wilson attended Greenville High School but did not graduate.

Classes
Students can take a variety of classes at the school.  Students who prefer to study vocational trades can take a bus to Vandalia and attend classes there at Okaw Valley Vocational Center.  The building trades class at the center each year purchases property in Vandalia, builds a house, and re-sells it; they have sold 33 homes this way.

Library
The school employs one full-time librarian; students can serve as workers in the library during their study periods.

Students can use the online reference resources, such as OCLC, from school or home to access the billion periodicals that OCLC WorldCat provides access to as research resources.  Additionally, as a member of the regional Lewis & Clark Library System and the statewide system IShare (formerly Illininet) and  statewide database, the library also provides students with access to thousands of books from hundreds of school, public, and college libraries by way of interlibrary loan.

Each student who wants one is issued a library card and is responsible for all materials checked out on that card.  Fines are charged for overdue books.

Sports programs
GHS is a member of the Illinois High School Association and plays in the South Central Conference.

Baseball
GHS has a boys' baseball team, divided into junior varsity and varsity squads.  In 2007, the boys' squad won the regional championship and advanced to the Kaskaskia Sectional. In 1998, The squad won the regional championship, then moved on to win the sectional championship, and ended the season placing 3rd in State.

Basketball
GHS has girls' and boys' basketball teams.  Both teams are split into freshman, junior varsity and varsity teams.  Greenville placed fourth in the 1923 boys' basketball state tournament.

Football
The GHS football program consists of three teams:  varsity, junior varsity and freshman.  The 2006-07 varsity football team went to the Elite Eight in the state championships, the third time a Greenville team had done so. They later went to the Final Four and lost by one point.

The football program was first begun in 1926, was suspended in 1930, and was reinstated at Greenville in 1956.

Golf
Greenville has both girls' and boys' golf teams, which play in the fall.  The girls' golf team was regional champion in 2006.

Soccer
Soccer is a boys' sport in the fall and a girls' sport in the spring.  It was added in 1999 as a varsity sport.

Softball
Softball is a girls' spring sport.

Tennis
Tennis at GHS is a girls' fall sport and a boys' spring sport.

Track and field
Track is a spring sport for both girls and boys at GHS.

Volleyball
Volleyball is a girls' fall sport at GHS.  In 2006, the team won a regional championship.

Cheerleading

Cheer is a year long sport. It is divided into seasons, then varsity and JV. There is football cheer which takes places in the fall. Also, basketball cheer, which takes place in the winter. Members of the basketball cheer team also compete in competitions. In 2021 the team won first in state(small division.) Also earning the highest score a small division team has ever won. In 2020 they won 4th place and 7th place in 2019. They also are a 5 time state qualifier and 3 time IHSA sectionals champion.

References

External links

Bond County Unit 2 Academic Foundation

Public high schools in Illinois
Greenville, Illinois
Schools in Bond County, Illinois